Saša Ilić may refer to:

Saša Ilić (footballer, born 1970), Macedonian football goalkeeper
Saša Ilić (footballer, born 1972), Serbian-Australian football goalkeeper
Saša Ilić (footballer, born 1977), Serbian football midfielder